Raymond Eugene Johnson (born March 26, 1974) is an American serial killer who killed his wife and her infant daughter in Tulsa, Oklahoma in 2007, shortly after being paroled from a previous manslaughter conviction in 1995. For the latter crimes, Johnson was convicted and sentenced to death, and is currently awaiting execution.

First murder
On September 11, 1995, the 21-year-old Johnson was in the company of 25-year-old Clarence Ray Oliver in Oklahoma City when the pair got into an argument. In the ensuing scuffle, Johnson pulled out a gun and threatened to shoot Oliver, who got into his car and attempted to drive away, only to get shot through the passenger side window. The car then crashed into a nearby ditch, where it was found the following day.

About two weeks later, Johnson was questioned by detectives regarding the murder and was soon arrested for the murder. In the ensuing trial, he pleaded guilty to manslaughter and was sentenced to 20 years in prison.

Release and double murder
After being paroled in 2005, Johnson moved to Tulsa, where he entered a relationship with a woman named Brooke Whitaker, a mother of four children. Their relationship quickly deteriorated as Johnson became physically abusive, stalked her, and even threatened to kill her on more than ten occasions. Due to this, she eventually filed a restraining order against him in April 2007, but the order was dropped the following month when neither party attended a court hearing scheduled for May 21.

On June 23, Johnson went to Whitaker's home, where he brutally beat her with a hammer, almost to the point of cracking her skull. He then doused her in gasoline, lit her on fire, and fled. Whitaker suffered severe burns, and her 7-month-old daughter, Kya, burned to death. Firefighters brought the barely alive Whitaker to Hillcrest Medical Center, where she died of her injuries. Shortly after the discovery of the crime, an arrest warrant was issued for Johnson. He was arrested later that same day in Coweta and extradited to Tulsa, where he was charged with two counts of first-degree murder and one count of arson. According to the arrest report submitted by the Tulsa Police Department, Johnson admitted to both slayings.

Trial and imprisonment
Jury selection for Johnson's trial took place in June 2009, with prosecutors announcing that they would seek the death penalty against him.
Not long after, Johnson was found guilty on all counts and sentenced to death for each of the murder charges and to life imprisonment on the arson charge. He did not offer a statement after the verdict, and the verdict itself was welcomed by the victims' family members.

Since his incarceration on death row, all of Johnson's appeals have been rejected by the respective courts. His final appeal was denied by the Supreme Court in November 2019, allowing for an execution date to be set.

On July 1, 2022, the Oklahoma Court of Criminal Appeals set execution dates for twenty-five state death row inmates, one of whom was Johnson. He was scheduled to be executed on May 2, 2024. His execution was later postponed due to a request by attorney general Gentner Drummond, who asked for sixty days between executions rather than thirty "to alleviate the burden on DOC personnel." He is currently awaiting a new execution date.

See also
 Capital punishment in Oklahoma
 List of death row inmates in Oklahoma
 List of people scheduled to be executed in the United States
 List of serial killers in the United States

References

External links
 Johnson v. State (2012)
 Johnson v. Royal (2016)

1974 births
20th-century American criminals
21st-century American criminals
American male criminals
American murderers of children
American people convicted of arson
American people convicted of murder
American people convicted of manslaughter
American prisoners sentenced to death
American prisoners sentenced to life imprisonment
American serial killers
Criminals from Oklahoma
Living people
Male serial killers
People convicted of murder by Oklahoma
People from Oklahoma City
Prisoners sentenced to death by Oklahoma
Prisoners sentenced to life imprisonment by Oklahoma
Uxoricides